The Second League of Armed Neutrality or the League of the North was an alliance of the north European naval powers Denmark–Norway, Prussia, Sweden, and Russia. It existed between 1800 and 1801 during the War of the Second Coalition and was initiated by Tsar Paul I of Russia. It was a revival of the First League of Armed Neutrality (1780), which had been quite successful during the American War of Independence in isolating Britain and resisting attempts to interfere with their shipping. However, unlike the First League, the Second League was considered to be much less successful.

Intention
The Second League was intended to protect neutral shipping against the Royal Navy's wartime policy of unlimited search of neutral shipping for French contraband, in an attempt to cut off military supplies and other trade to the First French Republic. The British government, not yet anxious to preserve Russian goodwill, openly considered it a form of alliance with France and attacked Denmark, destroying parts of its fleet in the First Battle of Copenhagen and forcing it to withdraw from the League. Britain also occupied the Danish West Indies between March 1801 and April 1802.

Collapse
After the attack of Denmark, Prussia invaded Hanover in April 1801 as a way to fight the British. Paul's assassination in March 1801 and the accession of Alexander I as Tsar of Russia led to a change of policy in Russia, and the alliance collapsed.  Russia would later join the British in a coalition against Napoleonic France.

Legacy
The prospect of a third league of armed neutrality potentially including Britain and France was briefly proposed in the 1860s,  during the American Civil War, following the Trent Incident in which the US Navy stopped a British vessel and removed two Confederate diplomats. Ultimately, the two countries did not form a league but maintained the principle of the freedom of the seas, and both remained neutral.

External links

Organizations established in 1800
Organizations disestablished in 1801
Diplomacy
Foreign relations of the Russian Empire
1800 in Denmark
1800 in Norway
1800 in Sweden
1800s in Prussia
1800 in the Russian Empire
Napoleonic Wars
Paul I of Russia